Piano Concerto No. 1, W453, is a composition for piano and orchestra by the Brazilian composer Heitor Villa-Lobos, written in 1945. A performance lasts about 38 minutes.

History
Villa-Lobos composed his First Piano Concerto in Rio de Janeiro in 1945. It was commissioned by the Canadian pianist Ellen Ballon, who gave the first performance at the Theatro Municipal in Rio de Janeiro on 11 October 1946, with the composer conducting the Orquestra Sinfônica do Theatro Municipal. Ballon also gave the American premiere of the concerto in Dallas, conducted by Antal Dorati in 1946, the Canadian premiere with Désiré Defauw on 28 October 1947 at the Plateau Auditorium in Montreal, and the London premiere with Thomas Beecham in 1956. She also recorded the work with Ernest Ansermet in 1949, with whom she also made return Canadian performances on 30 and 31 January 1951 with the Orchestre Symphonique de Montréal.

Instrumentation
The work is scored for solo piano and an orchestra consisting of piccolo, 2 flutes, 2 oboes, cor anglais, 2 clarinets, bass clarinet, 2 bassoons, contrabassoon, 4 horns, 3 trumpets, 3 tenor trombones, bass trombone, tuba, timpani, percussion (tam-tam, triangle, bass drum), harp, and strings.

Analysis

The concerto has four movements:
Allegro
Allegro (poco scherzando)
Andante – Andantino (quasi andante) – Cadenza
Allegro non troppo
Although Villa-Lobos adheres to the four-movement structure often found in piano concertos, he makes little effort to follow the traditional structures, based on melodic ideas, within the movements. Instead, he uses rhythmic elements to define sections of movements.

Discography
Villa-Lobos: Piano Concerto. Ellen Ballon, piano; Orchestre de la Suisse Romande, conducted by Ernest Ansermet. Recorded at the Victoria Hall, Geneva, June 1949. LP recording, 1 disc, 12 inch, 33⅓ rpm, monaural. London LLP 77. London: London Records, 1949. [Third movement heavily cut.]
Reissued on CD (with Albéniz: Five movements from Iberia, orch. Arbós, and Navarra, completed by Déodat de Séverac). Decca Eloquence 4800456. Sydney: Decca Records, 2010.
Э. Вилла-Лобос: концерт н1 для фортепиано с оркестром [H. Villa Lobos: Concerto No. 1 for Piano and Orchestra]. Arthur Moreira-Lima, piano; Moscow Radio Great Symphony Orchestra, conducted by Vladimir Fedoseev. Recorded 1976. LP recording, 1 disc: 1 audio disc: analog, 33⅓ rpm, stereo; 12 in. stereo. Melodiya C 10-08167-8 (matrix С10-08167/3-1, С10-08168/3-1). [Moscow]: Melodiya, 1980.
Heitor Villa-Lobos: 5 concertos para piano e orquestra. Fernando Lopes, piano; Orquestra Sinfônica Municipal de Campinas; conducted by Benito Juarez. Recorded 18–24 June, 1984, in the Teatro Interno do Centro de Covivência Cultural da Campinas. LP recording, 4 discs: 12 inch, 33⅓ rpm, stereo. Energia de São Paulo: LPVL 01/25 – LPVL 04/25. São Paulo: Energia de São Paulo, [1984?].
Heitor Villa-Lobos: Five Piano Concertos. Cristina Ortiz, piano; Royal Philharmonic Orchestra, conducted by Miguel Gómez-Martínez. Recorded at the Walthamstow Assembly Hall in October 1989, January and July 1990. 2-CD set: stereo. London 430 628-2 (430 629-2 and 430 630-2). London: The Decca Record Company Limited, 1992.
 Heitor Villa-Lobos: Cinco Conciertos para Piano y Orquesta. Elvira Santiago, piano (Concerto No. 1); Ulises Hernández, piano (Concerto No. 2); Patricio Malcolm, piano (Concerto No. 3); Harold López-Nussa, piano (Concerto No. 4); Roberto Urbay, piano (Concerto No. 5); Orquesta Sinfónica Nacional de Cuba, conducted by Enrique Pérez Mesa. Concerto No. 1 recorded at the Teatro Auditorium Amadeo Roldán, Havana, Cuba, 14 December 2003, part of the XXV Festival Internacional del Nuevo Cine Latinoamericano. 2 CDs + 1 DVD. Colibrí DVD/CD 050. Havana: Colibrí, 2006.

References

Sources
 .

Further reading
 Anon. 1956. Festival Hall: Beecham Concert. The Times, Issue 53684 (9 November): 3.
 Fortes Filho, Raimundo M. de Melo. 2004. "Concerto Para Piano e Orquestra n. 1 de Villa-Lobos: Um Estudo Analítico-Interpretativo". Masters thesis, Universidade Federal da Bahia.
 Fortes Filho, Raimundo Mentor de Melo, and Diana Santiago. 2004. "A politonalidade no concerto nº 1 para piano e orquestra de Villa-Lobos". In Anais do Simpósio de Pesquisa em Música 2004, edited by Norton Dudeque, 35–48. Curitiba, Brazil: Universidade Federal do Paraná (Departamento de Artes). .
 Johnson, Bret. 1992. "Villa-Lobos: Piano Concertos Nos. 1–5 by Cristina Ortiz, Miguel Gomez- Martinez". Tempo, New Series, No. 182, Russian Issue (September): 60–61.
 Salter, Lionel. 1992. Villa-Lobos Piano Concertos (review of CD, performed by Cristina Ortiz, Royal Philharmonic Orchestra, conducted by Miguel Gómez-Martínez). Gramophone (May).
 Tarasti, Eero. 1995. Heitor Villa-Lobos: The Life and Works, 1887–1959, translated from the Finnish by the author. Jefferson, North Carolina, and London: McFarland. .

1945 compositions
Compositions by Heitor Villa-Lobos
Villa-Lobos 1
Music with dedications